Nimmu–Padum–Darcha road or Zanskar Highway is a road under construction between the Indian union territory of Ladakh and the state of Himachal Pradesh, passing through the region of Zanskar. It connects Nimmu in the Indus Valley to Padum, the capital of Zanskar, to Darcha village in Lahul and Spiti.
It provides an alternative to the Leh–Manali Highway in linking Ladakh with the rest of India. It is being built by the Border Roads Organisation (BRO) of the Indian army.  Construction of road is expected to be completed by late 2023. Already completed Atal tunnel and the under-construction Shingo La Tunnel which will be completed by 2025 will provide all weather connectivity.

It is estimated that travel on this road will only take 10-12 hours to reach Leh from Manali, as opposed to the Leh-Manali highway taking almost 14-16 hours under good weather condition. The road is strategic for the Indian Army as it is set back the international border and can facilitate safe troop movements.

History

The regions of Lahul (Lha yul) and Spiti (sPi ti) were earlier part of Ladakh.
They were attached to Zanskar.

By 1847, when the British Raj arrived, they were separated from Ladakh and made a part of British Punjab. Thus the connections between Zanskar and Lahul and Spiti were partly severed.
Nevertheless, Lahaulis fought for the defence of Ladakh and Zanskar during the Indo-Pakistani War of 1947–1948. Major Prithi Chand trekked over the Zoji La pass in winter to arrive in Leh before the raiders from Gilgit.

In 1979, when Ladakh was divided into two districts by the state of Jammu and Kashmir, the predominantly Buddhist region of Zanskar was attached to the Muslim-majority Kargil district. Work on the stretch of the road between Nimmu and Padum, called the Chadar Road, was begun by the Jammu and Kashmir Public Works Department in the 1970s.
But it was reportedly cancelled by a member of the Legislative Assembly from Srinagar to prevent linking of Zanskar with Leh. Due to linguistic and religious similarities between Zanskar and Leh, the politicians of Kargil had apprehensions that it might eventually come under Leh's jurisdiction. So, instead of the Chadar Road, a road between Kargil and Padum was constructed.

Following the Kargil War in 1999, the unfinished Chadar Road project was handed over to the Border Roads Organisation (BRO).
Trekkers on the Chadar trek (the frozen Zanskar River during winters) perceived the planned road as spoiling the wild and pristine environment. The central government questioned the state of Jammu and Kashmir in 2007 about the need for the road. The councillor of the Lingshed constituency replied that it was a "right" and a necessity for the development of the remote and backward villages of the region.

In September 2020, the Border Roads Organisation reported that only a 30-kilometre stretch of the road remained incomplete.

Route

Nimmu terminus to Padum 
Total distance from Nimmo to Padum is 155 km on the proposed alignment, only 30 km remains to be commissioned. This section covers following towns/villages:
 Nimo
 Chiling
 Nerak
 Zangla
 Padum

Padum to Shingo La pass 
At Purne, the road crosses the river and continues along the Kargiakh Chu, a left bank tributary of the Tsarap up to Lakhang Sumdo. This distance of  has a gentle gradient.

Shingo La to Darcha terminus 
The newly-surfaced road (as of Oct '21) continues from the Shingo La pass down to the Darcha terminus. The road descends on the right bank of the Jankar Nala through Ramjak to Zanskar Sumdo, which has a helipad. On the sides of the gorge is a Buddhist shrine to the deity Palden Lhamo. The road crosses the gorge and runs along the left bank via Chikka and Rarik to meet the Leh-Manali Highway about 2 km before Darcha.

See also
 Leh-Manali Highway
 Shingo La
 Zanskar River

Notes

References

Bibliography
 
 

Scenic roads in India
Roads in Himachal Pradesh
Himalayas
Roads in Ladakh
Transport in Ladakh
Transport in Himachal Pradesh